Roll Out the Barrel is a studio album by Jad Fair and Kramer, released in 1988 by Shimmy Disc.

Accolades

Track listing

Personnel 
Adapted from Roll Out the Barrel liner notes.

Musicians
 Jad Fair – vocals, guitar
 Don Fleming – guitar
 Kramer – production, engineering
 David Licht – drums, percussion
 Rebby Sharp – vocals, banjo
 John Zorn – saxophone

Additional musicians
Ralph Carney – saxophone (9)
Kim Gordon – instruments (22)
Scott Jarvis – drums (23)
Penn Jillette – vocals (4, 21)
Thurston Moore – instruments (22)
Production and additional personnel
David Fair – illustrations

Release history

References

External links 
 

1988 albums
Collaborative albums
Albums produced by Kramer (musician)
Jad Fair albums
Kramer (musician) albums
Shimmy Disc albums